Tabata may refer to:

 Tabata (ward), an administrative ward in Dar es Salaam Region, Tanzania
 Tabata (surname), a Japanese surname
 Tabata Station (Nagano), Nagano Prefecture
 Tabata Station (Tokyo), Tokyo
 Tabata method, a form of high-intensity interval training